CS Dinamo București is a volleyball club based in Bucharest, Romania, that competes in the Divizia A1, the top tier of Romanian volleyball.

Team honours

Domestic competitions 
Divizia A1 (18) 
  1953, 1958, 1972, 1973, 1974, 1975, 1976, 1977, 1979, 1980, 1981, 1982, 1983, 1984, 1985, 1992, 1994, 1995
  1988, 1989, 2007, 2009, 2022
  2006, 2008, 2010, 2011, 2012, 2014
Romanian Cup (14) 
  2010, 2011, 2019, 2021
  2012, 2014
Romanian Super Cup (2) 
  2021, 2022
  2019

European competitions 
CEV Champions League (3)
  1966, 1967, 1981
  1968, 1974, 1977 
 CEV Cup Winner's Cup (1) 
  1979

See also 
 CS Dinamo București (women's volleyball)

Romanian volleyball clubs
Volleyball
Sport in Bucharest
Volleyball clubs established in 1948
1948 establishments in Romania